Persiks stand for Persatuan Sepakbola Indonesia Kuantan Singingi (en: Football Association of Indonesia Kuantan Singingi). Persiks Kuantan Singingi is an Indonesian football club based in Kuantan Singingi, Riau. Club played at Liga 3 (Indonesia).

References

External links
Liga-Indonesia.co.id

 
Football clubs in Indonesia
Football clubs in Riau